Craggy Island is the fictional location of comedy television series Father Ted. It is also the name of non-fictional locations:

Craggy Island (Livingston Island), in the subantarctic South Shetland Islands
Craggy Island (Tasmania)